The Virginia Southern Railroad  is a shortline railroad division of the North Carolina and Virginia Railroad , a subsidiary of the Genesee & Wyoming, with rights to operate  of track between Norfolk Southern Railway connections at Oxford, North Carolina and Burkeville, Virginia. The southernmost segment between Clarksville, Virginia and Oxford is out of service.

The line was built by the Oxford and Clarksville Railroad, Clarksville and North Carolina Railroad, Atlantic and Danville Railway, Richmond and Mecklenburg Railroad, and Richmond and Danville Railroad, all predecessors of the Southern Railway (except for the short piece of A&D, which left the Southern system for the Norfolk and Western Railway), and in November 1988 successor Norfolk Southern leased it to the new Virginia Southern Railroad as the first spin-off in its Thoroughbred Shortline Program.

The NCVA and VSRR were previously owned by Railtex and RailAmerica, and is now operated by the Buckingham Branch Railroad.

See also

Genesee & Wyoming
Thoroughbred Shortline Program

References

External links
Official website
map
map

Virginia railroads
North Carolina railroads
Switching and terminal railroads
RailAmerica
Spin-offs of the Norfolk Southern Railway
Railway companies established in 1988